The 2013 World Curling Championships may refer to one of the following curling championships:
2013 Ford World Men's Curling Championship
2013 World Women's Curling Championship
2013 World Junior Curling Championships
2013 World Senior Curling Championships
2013 World Wheelchair Curling Championship
2013 World Mixed Doubles Curling Championship

Wo